Charles F. McCullough (1866 - April 13, 1898) was a Major League Baseball pitcher for one season.  In 1890 he played for the Brooklyn Gladiators and the Syracuse Stars, both of the American Association.  He was a native of Dublin, Ireland.
   
He did complete 27 out of 28 starts in the 1890 season, but allowed 406 baserunners (276 hits, 116 walks, and 13 hit batsmen) in 241.2 innings pitched.  He also threw 21 wild pitches, seventh in the league.  His earned run average was 4.88, which was a full run over the league average, and his record was 5-23.

At the plate he was 3-for-95 (.032) with one run batted in and three runs scored.  He drew six walks, increasing his on-base percentage to .089.  On defense, he had a fielding percentage of .885, below the league's average of .907 for pitchers.

External links

Major League Baseball pitchers
19th-century baseball players
Major League Baseball players from Ireland
Irish baseball players
Irish emigrants to the United States (before 1923)
Brooklyn Gladiators players
Syracuse Stars (AA) players
Sportspeople from Dublin (city)
1866 births
1898 deaths
Mt. Carmel (minor league baseball) players
Scranton Miners players
Birmingham (minor league baseball) players
Mobile (minor league baseball) players
Olean (minor league baseball) players
Rochester Hop Bitters players
Brockton Shoemakers players
Lewiston (minor league baseball) players
Burials at Holy Cross Cemetery, Brooklyn